Villarrodrigo is a city located in the province of Jaén, Spain. According to the 2005 census (INE), the city has a population of 510 inhabitants.

See also 
 Lion of Bienservida

References

Municipalities in the Province of Jaén (Spain)